Juan Pablo Varillas was the defending champion but chose not to defend his title.

Thanasi Kokkinakis won the title after defeating Enzo Couacaud 6–3, 6–4 in the final.

Seeds

Draw

Finals

Top half

Bottom half

References

Main draw
Qualifying draw

Biella Challenger VI - 1